The rijksweg N36 is a Dutch expressway, managed by Rijkswaterstaat between the N48 near Arriërveld and the A35 near Wierden, and hereby is an important north-south connection route in the province of Overijssel. The part of the road between the A35 and the N34 mainly consists of grade-separated crossings. The road also consists of separated lanes around Almelo, although it only has one lane in each direction. The total length of the N36 is approximately 36 kilometers (22 miles).

Route description

History

Junction and exit list 
The entire route is in Overijssel.

References

Motorways in the Netherlands
Motorways in Overijssel